Middleton in the U.S. state of Wisconsin may refer to:
 Middleton, Wisconsin, a city
 Middleton (town), Wisconsin, a town
 Middleton Junction, Wisconsin, an unincorporated community
 West Middleton, Wisconsin, an unincorporated community